Destiny is a 1942 Austrian-German historical drama film directed by Géza von Bolváry and starring Heinrich George, Werner Hinz, and Christian Kayßler. The film was made by Wien-Film, a company set up by the Germans after they had annexed Austria in 1938. The film's sets were designed by the art directors Kurt Herlth and Werner Schlichting. The film was banned after the Second World War for its perceived Nazi content.

Plot
When the commander of a Bulgarian castle is killed in combat, his steward brings up his two children.

Cast

References

Bibliography

External links 
 

1942 films
Films of Nazi Germany
German drama films
1942 drama films
1940s German-language films
Films directed by Géza von Bolváry
Films set in Bulgaria
Films set in the 1910s
German black-and-white films
1940s German films